The 1965 Commonwealth Snooker Championship was a professional non-ranking snooker tournament, which took place in June 1965 at the Canterbury-Hurlstone RSL Club, Hurlstone Park, New South Wales. The final, held on 9 June, was decided on an aggregate points score across five . Eddie Charlton won the tournament by defeating Warren Simpson 369–208 in the final.

Simpson compiled a new Australian record  of 137 against Frank Harris in a preliminary round match.

Results
Players in bold denote match winners.

References

1965 in snooker
1965 in Australian sport
June 1965 sports events in Australia